The All-Ireland Senior Hurling Championship of 1995 (known for the first time for sponsorship reasons as the Guinness Hurling Championship 1995) was the 109th staging of Ireland's premier hurling knock-out competition.  Clare won the championship, beating Offaly 1-13 to 2-8 in the final at Croke Park, Dublin, it was their first All-Ireland win since 1914.

Pre-championship

Sponsorship

In 1994 Bank of Ireland became the first ever sponsor of the All-Ireland Senior Football Championship.  Following the success of this deal it was decided that the hurling championship could also benefit from sponsorship.  The decision, however, to award the sponsorship deal to Guinness was a controversial one, as there were concerns over the Gaelic Athletic Association's association with an alcoholic drinks company. Former President of the GAA, Dr. Mick Loftus, was one of the most vocal critics of the proposed sponsorship deal.  At a meeting of the Gaelic Athletic Association (GAA) Central Council on 6 May, the decision to make Guinness the sponsor was accepted almost unanimously.  The sponsorship deal involved Guinness providing £3 million to the GAA over three years.  £500,000 of this money would go to funding the championship, while a similar amount would go to the marketing and promotion of the game.

Betting

Prior to the opening of the championship former All-Ireland-winning journalists Seán Moran and Tom Humphries gave their predictions for the upcoming championship in The Irish Times.  Kilkenny were regarded as the strongest contenders for All-Ireland glory in 1995.  They were the reigning National Hurling League champions and had won back-to-back championship titles from three successive final appearances between 1991 and 1993.  Offaly, in spite of being reigning All-Ireland champions, were placed second to Kilkenny in the championship stakes.  They faced a more difficult passage through the provincial series, however, an anticipated Leinster final meeting with Kilkenny was the only thing stopping the team from making it two-in-a-row.  Following the trauma of their All-Ireland defeat the previous year, Limerick were still regarded as the brightest prospect in Munster.  They were given the nod to retain their provincial crown and challenge, once again, for the All-Ireland title.

The championship

Participating counties

Format

Munster Championship

Quarter-final: (2 matches) These are two lone matches between the first four teams drawn from the province of Munster.  Two teams are eliminated at this stage, while two teams advance to the next round.

Semi-finals: (2 matches) The winners of the two quarter-finals join the other two Munster teams to make up the semi-final pairings.  Two teams are eliminated at this stage, while two teams advance to the next round.

Final: (1 match) The winners of the two semi-finals contest this game.  One team is eliminated at this stage, while the winners advance to the All-Ireland semi-final.

Leinster Championship
First Round: (1 match) This is a single match between two 'weaker' teams drawn from the province of Leinster.  One team is eliminated at this stage, while the winners advance to the second round.

Second Round: (1 match) The winner of the first round play another 'weaker' team.  One team is eliminated at this stage, while the winners advance to the Leinster quarter-final.

Quarter-finals: (2 matches) The winner of the second-round game joins three other Leinster teams to make up the two quarter-final pairings.  Two teams are eliminated at this stage, while two teams advance to the Leinster semi-finals.

Semi-finals: (2 matches) The winners of the two quarter-finals join two other Leinster teams to make up the semi-final pairings.  Two teams are eliminated at this stage, while two teams advance to the Leinster final.

Final: (1 match) The winner of the two semi-finals contest this game.  One team is eliminated at this stage, while the winners advance to the All-Ireland semi-final.

Ulster Championship
Final: (1 match) This is a lone match between the two competing Ulster teams.  One team is eliminated at this stage, while the winners advance to the All-Ireland quarter-final.

Connacht Championship
Final: (1 match) This is a lone match between the two competing Connacht teams.  One team is eliminated at this stage, while the winners advance to the All-Ireland semi-final where the play the Munster champions.

All-Ireland Championship
Quarter-final: (1 match) This is a lone match between the Ulster champions and the All-Ireland 'B' champions.  One team is eliminated at this stage, while the winners advance to the All-Ireland semi-final where they play the Leinster champions.

Semi-finals: (2 matches) The Munster and Leinster champions will play the winners of the lone quarter-final and the Connacht champions.  Two teams are eliminated at this stage, while the two winnerss advance to the All-Ireland final.

Final: (1 match) The two semi-final winners will contest the final.

Managerial changes

Pre-championship

Connacht Senior Hurling Championship

Leinster Senior Hurling Championship

Munster Senior Hurling Championship

Ulster Senior Hurling Championship

All-Ireland Senior Hurling Championship

Championship statistics

Scoring

First goal of the championship: John Byrne for Carlow against Meath (Leinster first round)
Last goal of the championship: Éamonn Taaffe for Clare against Offaly (All-Ireland final)
Hat-trick heroes:
First hat-trick of the championship: Seán McLoughlin for Westmeath against Carlow (Leinster first round)
Second hat-trick of the championship: Billy Byrne for Wexford against Westmeath (Leinster quarter-final)
Third hat-trick of the championship: Eamon Morrissey for Kilkenny against Dublin (Leinster semi-final)
Widest winning margin: 31 points
Wexford 6-23 : 1-7 Westmeath (Leinster quarter-final)
Most goals in a match: 9
Carlow 3-14 : 6-6 Westmeath (Leinster first round)
Most points in a match: 34
Kerry 0-12 : 1-22 Cork (Munster semi-final)
Tipperary 4-23 : 1-11 Waterford (Munster semi-final)
Most goals by one team in a match: 6
Westmeath 6-6 : 3-14 Carlow (Leinster first round)
Most goals scored by a losing team: 3
Carlow 3-14 : 6-6 Westmeath (Leinster first round)
Cork 3-9 : 2-13 Clare (Munster semi-final)
Most points scored by a losing team: 14
Carlow 3-14 : 6-6 Westmeath (Leinster second round)

Overall
Most goals scored - Kilkenny (8)
Most goals conceded - Carlow (7)
Fewest goals conceded - Tipperary (1)
Fewest points conceded - Meath (11)
Fewest goals scored - Meath, Limerick, London (0)
Fewest points scored - London (9)

Discipline
 First red card of the championship: Johnny Kavanagh for Carlow against Meath (Leinster first round)

Miscellaneous
 Down win the Ulster title for the third time in their history. It is their second provincial title in three years.
 The All-Ireland semi-final meeting of Clare and Galway is their first championship clash since the 1967 championship.
 Clare win the Munster title for the first time since the 1932 championship. They later claim the All-Ireland title for the first time since 1914.
 The meeting of Down and Offaly in the All-Ireland semi-final was their first-ever clash in the history of the championship.
 The meeting of Clare and Offaly in the All-Ireland final was their first-ever clash in the history of the championship.

Top scorers

Season

Single game

Player facts

Debutantes

The following players made their début in the 1995 championship:

Retirees

The following players played their last game in the 1995 championship:

External links
All-Ireland Senior Hurling Championship 1995 Results

Bibliography
 Corry, Eoghan, The GAA Book of Lists (Hodder Headline Ireland, 2005).
 Donegan, Des, The Complete Handbook of Gaelic Games (DBA Publications Limited, 2005).
 Sweeney, Éamonn, Munster Hurling Legends (The O'Brien Press, 2002).

See also

1995
All-Ireland Senior Hurling Championship